Urnamman was a Sumerian warrior hero. Originally hailing from Lagash, he travelled widely and was hailed for his courage, compassion and inventiveness.It is said that he discovered the secret of felt making.

Some of his exploits are detailed in a cuneiform slab discovered in Nippur. He is generally held to not have been a real person, but a myth.

References
Sumeri ja sen henkinen perintö eritoten Vanhassa testamentissa Armas Salonen

Sumerian people